Carl Forster (born 4 June 1992) is an English professional rugby league footballer who plays as a  and is the head coach for the North Wales Crusaders in Betfred League 1.

He played for St Helens in the Super League, and on loan from Saints

He has previously coached Whitehaven in League 1 and the Rochdale Hornets in the Championship.

Background
Forster was born in St Helens, Merseyside, England.

Playing career

St Helens
He signed for Saints from local amateur club Pilkington Recs in 2009.
2011's Super League XVI was his first as a professional with St. Helens.
He enjoyed Grand Final success with St. Helens Academy. In June 2012, Carl signed a 2-year contract with St. Helens.

Salford Red Devils
He played for Salford Red Devils in the Super League until the end of 2015.

Swinton Lions
For 2016 season he played for Swinton Lions.

Whitehaven RLFC
For the 2017 season, Forster played for Whitehaven while also serving as the team's head coach.

Rochdale Hornets
In 2019 Forster moved on to the Rochdale Hornets as player-coach before moving back to Whitehaven that season on loan after re-signing from Rochdale.

Barrow Raiders
On 23 Sep 2019 it was reported that he had signed for Barrow Raiders in the RFL League 1 on a Player-only 1-year deal

North Wales Crusaders
On 5 Nov 2022 it was reported that he had taken up the player-coach role at North Wales Crusaders in the RFL League 1 for the 2023 season

References

External links
Whitehaven profile
Whitehaven coaching profile
Saints Heritage Society profile

1992 births
Living people
Barrow Raiders players
English rugby league coaches
English rugby league players
London Broncos players
North Wales Crusaders coaches
North Wales Crusaders players
Pilkington Recs players
Rochdale Hornets coaches
Rochdale Hornets players
Rugby league players from St Helens, Merseyside
Rugby league props
Salford Red Devils players
Swinton Lions players
St Helens R.F.C. players
Whitehaven R.L.F.C. coaches
Whitehaven R.L.F.C. players